Nowabad may refer to:

Nowabad-e Ish, Afghanistan
Nowabad, Chaharmahal and Bakhtiari, Iran
Nowabad, Mohr, Fars Province, Iran
Nowabad, Qir and Karzin, Fars Province, Iran
Nowabad, Hamadan, Iran
Nowabad, Khuzestan, Iran
Nowabad, Amol, Mazandaran Province, Iran
Nowabad, Dabuy-ye Jonubi, Amol County, Mazandaran Province, Iran
Nowabad, Dasht-e Sar, Amol County, Mazandaran Province, Iran
Nowabad, Savadkuh, Mazandaran Province, Iran
Nowabad, Qazvin, Iran
Nowabad, Razavi Khorasan, Iran
Nowabad-e Espian, Iran